United Nations Security Council resolution 2242 was adopted in 2015.

See also
 List of United Nations Security Council Resolutions 2201 to 2300 (2015–2016)

References

External links
Text of the Resolution at undocs.org

2015 United Nations Security Council resolutions
October 2015 events